Norwegian DJ, record producer, musician and turntablist Cashmere Cat has made two studio albums, three extended plays and several singles.

Albums

Extended plays

Singles

As lead artist

As featured artist

Other appearances

Songwriting and production credits

Remixes and edits 
 "Cross the Dancefloor (DJ Final Remix)", by Treasure Fingers, 2009
 "I'll Get You (Final Remix)", on Kitsuné X The Cobrasnake EP by Classixx featuring Jeppe, Hush Sound, 2009
 "220V/Spektral (Final Mix)", on Bananfluer Overalt by Jaga Jazzist, Ninja Tune, 2010
 "Les Paradis Artificiels (Final Remix)", on Les Paradis Artificiels EP by Douze, Discotexas, 2010
 "Mátkelávlla (The Traveller)", on Fargga by Berit Margrethe Oskal, Mátki Records, 2010
 "Oslo (Final Remix)", by Mathias Eick, 2010
 "Faith (Final Remix)", on Faith Remixes by Montée, Oslo Records, 2011
 "Different (Cashmere Cat Remix)", on Different (Special Remix Edition) EP, LidoLido, Universal Music A/S, 2011
 "Fake ID (Kidz in the Club) (Cashmere Cat Remix)", on Different (Special Remix Edition) EP, LidoLido, Universal Music A/S, 2011
 "Treasury of We (X.V. & Cashmere Cat Remix)", by Glasser, 2011
 "Shell Suite (Cashmere Cat Remix)", on Shell Suite & Remixes by Chad Valley, Loose Lips, 2011
 "Heart on Fire (Merry-Go-Round) – Cashmere Cat Remix", by Winta, daWorks Entertainment Ltd, 2011
 "Jaywalking (Cashmere Cat Remix)", on Jaywalking (Remixes) by Samsaya, 3 millimeter, 2011
 "Give (Cashmere Cat Remix)", on Best Intentions by Sound of Rum, Sunday Best Recordings, 2011
 "Bruk (Fellepus Remix)", on Draw EP by Slick Shoota, Hyperboloid Records, 2012
 "National Anthem (Cashmere Cat Remix)", by Lana Del Rey, Interscope Records, 2012
 "773 Love (Cashmere Cat Edit)", by Jeremih, published on SoundCloud, 2012
 "No Lie (Cashmere Cat Edit)", by 2 Chainz featuring Drake, published on SoundCloud, 2012
 "Call My Name (Cashmere Cat Remix)", on Tove Styrke by Tove Styrke, Sony Music Germany, 2012
 "Wettex (Cashmere Cat Remix)", on Electric Empire Remixes by Feadz & Kito, Ed Banger Records, 2012
 "Fallin Love (Cashmere Cat Remix)", by BenZel, published on SoundCloud, 2013
 "Do You... (Cashmere Cat Remix)", by Miguel, published on SoundCloud, 2013
 "Be My Baby (Cashmere Cat Edit)", by Ariana Grande, published on SoundCloud, 2014
 "Octahate (Cashmere Cat Remix)", by Ryn Weaver, Friends Keep Secrets, 2014
 "And Uh (Cashmere Cat Edit)", by Kid Antoine, Her Records, 2015

References

Notes

References 

Discographies of Norwegian artists
Electronic music discographies